Rokin is an Amsterdam Metro station on Line 52. It began service in July 2018 and is under the Rokin canal in Amsterdam, Netherlands.

References

Amsterdam Metro stations
Railway stations opened in 2018
2018 establishments in the Netherlands
Railway stations in the Netherlands opened in the 21st century